The F-31 Sport Cruiser is a family of American trailerable trimaran sailboats that was designed by New Zealander Ian Farrier and first built in 1991. 

The F-31 is the production development of the Farrier F-9, which were built by custom shops in small numbers and by amateur builders from plans. The first F-9 prototype was launched on 29 September 1991.

Production
The boats were built by Corsair Marine in the United States, starting in 1991, but are now out of production.

Design

The F-31 is a small recreational trimaran, built predominantly of fiberglass. The hull is constructed with a rigid PVC foam core, vacuum bagged moulded to the skins, while the structural beams are reinforced with carbon fiber.

It has a fractional sloop rig, a plumb stem, a reverse transom, an internally-mounted spade-type rudder controlled by a tiller and a retractable daggerboard, mounted at 18°, with the daggerboard trunk stepping the mast. The outrigger floats are folding for storage or ground transportation on a trailer, with a maximum width of under eight feet for highway transport. The outrigger floats fold into cutouts in the lower hull to reduce trailering width. When deployed the outriggers are set at a fixed 8° to the hull, so that they are upright and thus symmetrical, when each is in the water. Due to the employment of a daggerboard, the design can easily be beached.

The boat is normally fitted with a small outboard motor of typically  for docking and maneuvering.

Operational history
In 1992 the F-31 was named the Australian Sailboat of the Year. In April 1992 Fred Gan's F-31 Ostac Triumph won the bi-annual Australian Offshore Multihull Championships. In the associated Brisbane to Gladstone Ocean Race, Bobsled, a 67-foot, million dollar, racing monohull boat, sponsored by Société Générale, made headlines in breaking the monohull record by an impressive hour and a half. The trailerable F-31 caught and passed Bobsled, finishing an hour and fifteen minutes ahead.

In a 2000 review, writer Bob Perry of Sailing Magazine wrote of the F-31, "In looking at the accommodations, it would be better not to compare this design to a monohull with a similar LOA but, instead, to compare displacements. There is no question that the 31-foot Farrier tri has less interior volume than a standard 31-foot monohull, but you cannot trail[er] most 31-foot monohulls. The F-31 has comfortable accommodations for two couples, and boat speed that will blow the doors off a 31-foot monohull...Ian designs handsome boats. The F-31 is no exception... Just be aware that this 31-footer is capable of sailing with some big monohulls."

Variants
F-9A
The initial F-9, designed for amateur construction from plans. More than 300 completed.
F-9AX
A version of the F-9A with expanded interior space, with a 15% wider center hull for more room and a 16% higher load capacity.
F-9R
A high performance racing version of the F-9A with a rotating mast.
F-31 Sport Cruiser
This model was designed by Ian Farrier and built by Corsair Marine. It improved over the F-9 in having a smaller folded width for trailering of under .
Corsair 31
This model was designed by Ian Farrier and built by Corsair Marine. After Corsair and Ian Farrier ended their business relationship in 2000, Corsair continued to develop the F-31's design and renamed the modified design the Corsair 31. Options included a racing package, with a bowsprit and carbon fiber spars. It was built in an aft-cockpit and center-cockpit version.

See also
List of sailing boat types
List of multihulls

Related development
F-27 Sport Cruiser

References

External links

Trimarans
1990s sailboat type designs
Sailing yachts
Trailer sailers
Sailboat type designs by Ian Farrier
Sailboat types built by Farrier Marine
Sailboat types built by Corsair Marine